Dubai Medical College for Girls is the first private college awarding degree of Medicine & Surgery in the United Arab Emirates.

References

External links
 Dubai Medical College for Girls

Universities and colleges in Dubai
Women's universities and colleges in the United Arab Emirates
Educational institutions established in 1985
Medical schools in the United Arab Emirates
1985 establishments in the United Arab Emirates